Woodledge is a historic home located in West Whiteland Township, Chester County, Pennsylvania. The house was built in 1935 in the Colonial Revival style.  It consists of a -story, three-bay main block flanked by a two-story, two-bay wing and garage.  Also on the property is a one-story, stone and frame stable.

It was listed on the National Register of Historic Places in 1988.

References

Houses on the National Register of Historic Places in Pennsylvania
Colonial Revival architecture in Pennsylvania
Houses completed in 1935
Houses in Chester County, Pennsylvania
National Register of Historic Places in Chester County, Pennsylvania